Rudolph Bernard  Isley (born April 1, 1939 in Cincinnati, Ohio) is an American singer-songwriter and is one of the founding members of The Isley Brothers.

Life and career
Born and raised in Cincinnati, Ohio, Rudy began singing in church at a young age. By his teen years, he was singing as member of The Isley Brothers with Kelly, Ronnie and Vernon. In 1957, following Vernon's death, the remaining three elder Isleys moved to New York to seek a recording deal, later recording for smaller labels until landing a deal with RCA Records in 1959 where they wrote, recorded and released their first significant recording, "Shout". By the summer of that year, the Isley family had moved from Cincinnati to a home in Englewood, New Jersey.

Following "Shout", the brothers recorded for other labels with modest success with exceptions including the top 40 hit, "Twist & Shout" and the Motown hit, "This Old Heart of Mine (Is Weak for You)". In the 1960s, Rudy and his brothers founded the T-Neck Records label to promote their recordings. Following their split with Motown, they reactivated the label and scored a Grammy-winning smash with "It's Your Thing" in 1969. While Ron Isley was the prominent lead singer of the group, Rudy did record a few lead vocals on some Isley Brothers songs, following the reactivation of T-Neck. After the group reorganized into a band after the inclusion of younger brothers Ernie and Marvin Isley and in-law Chris Jasper, Rudy was known for wearing hats and fur-attired clothing and was also known for carrying a cane. Rudy would share lead vocals with his brothers Ron and Kelly on hits such as "Fight the Power" and "Livin' in the Life". Rudy also sang full lead on other tunes such as "You Still Feel the Need" from the album, Harvest for the World, and their 1979 hit, "It's a Disco Night (Rock Don't Stop)". In 1986, Rudy's eldest brother Kelly suddenly died of a heart attack in his sleep. Kelly's death devastated Rudy as the brothers had been close. After recording the albums, Smooth Sailin' and Spend the Night, Rudy Isley left the group and the music industry for good in 1989 to follow a lifelong goal of being a Christian minister. Rudy was inducted as member of the Isleys to the Rock and Roll Hall of Fame in 1992.

Personal life
Isley married Elaine Jasper in 1958. At first, Isley and his family settled at a house he bought in Teaneck, New Jersey, where they lived for ten years. By the mid-1970s, Rudy was living in Haworth, New Jersey. Though having had health issues following his exit from the Isleys, his wife Elaine has stated that his health "is good and he is watching what he eats." Rudy briefly reunited with Ronald & Ernie in 2004 where the brothers were honored with a lifetime achievement award at the BET Awards. Rudy served as best man for brother Ronnie's 2006 marriage to his backup singer Kandy Johnson. Rudy and his wife were long-term residents of Otisville, New York before moving to Olympia Fields near Chicago in 2013, buying R. Kelly's former house to be near their children and grandchildren.

References

External links
Rockabilly page on Rudolph Isley

1939 births
African-American Christian clergy
African-American rock singers
African-American male singer-songwriters
American funk singers
American rhythm and blues singer-songwriters
American soul singers
American tenors
The Isley Brothers members
Living people
Musicians from Cincinnati
People from Englewood, New Jersey
People from Haworth, New Jersey
People from Teaneck, New Jersey
Singer-songwriters from New Jersey
Singer-songwriters from Ohio
People from Olympia Fields, Illinois
People from Orange County, New York
20th-century African-American male singers
Singer-songwriters from New York (state)